Procer may refer to:

Megascolia procer, a solitary wasp in the family Scoliidae
Farcimen procer, a species of Farcimen
Diplocephalus procer; see List of Linyphiidae species (A–H)

See also
Prócer (disambiguation)